Hurricane Anna impacted Central America and the Windward Islands in July 1961. The first tropical cyclone and first hurricane of the hurricane season, Anna developed on July 20 from an easterly wave located in the Intertropical Convergence Zone (ITCZ) over the Windward Islands. Initially a tropical storm, it moved westward across the Caribbean Sea. Favorable environmental conditions allowed Anna to reach hurricane intensity late on July 20. Early on the following day, the storm strengthened into a Category 2 hurricane on the modern-day Saffir–Simpson hurricane wind scale. The hurricane then weakened slightly while approaching the coast of Honduras. Anna rapidly weakened over land and dissipated later that day.

As a developing tropical cyclone over the Leeward Islands, Anna produced strong winds over Grenada, though damage was limited to some crops, trees, and telephone poles. Other islands experienced gusty winds, but no damage. Strong winds caused widespread damage in northern Honduras. Throughout the country, at least 36 homes were destroyed and 228 were damaged. Severe damage in the Gracias a Dios Department left hundreds of people homeless. Additionally, high winds toppled approximately 5,000 coconut trees. Overall, Anna caused a fatality and $300,000 in damage (1961 USD), primarily in Central America.

Meteorological history

The origins of Hurricane Anna were likely from an easterly wave located over Africa. Although no circulation existed while the wave approached the Windward Islands, significant amounts of deep convection was associated with the system and located near the Intertropical Convergence Zone (ITCZ). According to HURDAT – the North Atlantic hurricane database – the system developed into Tropical Storm Anna at 0000 UTC on July 20, as confirmed by a reconnaissance aircraft flight.

Later that day, the storm was upgraded to a hurricane after a reconnaissance aircraft reported hurricane-force winds. Anna then deepened more steadily, becoming a Category 2 hurricane early on July 21. Early on July 23, Anna weakened to a Category 1 hurricane while approaching the northern coast of Honduras. Late on July 24, the system weakened to a tropical storm and then dissipated.

Preparations
The United States Weather Bureau issued tropical cyclone watches and warnings for Venezuela, Curaçao, Bonaire and Aruba. In Jamaica, meteorologists forecast that the storm would bypass the island to the south without causing any effects. As Anna continued westward, it was predicted to make landfall in either northern Nicaragua or southeastern Honduras. Residents in those countries were advised to take precautions ahead of the storm. Central Americans residing along Gulf of Honduras were also warned about  tides and strong winds. As the storm neared Honduras, small boats and other water craft were advised to remain in port. Additionally, a hurricane watch was posted for the Swan Islands. In Belize, the threat of the storm forced 100 residents to evacuate their homes, while numerous businesses were closed down. At Belize Harbor, many ships and boats were moved upstream inland. The hurricane was also forecast to bring heavy rainfall to the mountainous areas of Belize, causing a concern for flash flooding. Additionally, Belize's Church Welfare Service began to ship clothing and other materials in anticipation of the hurricane.

Impact

Damage from the storm's impact on Grenada was limited to banana crops, trees, and telephone poles. Winds were light on Barbados and Saint Lucia, reaching only  on both islands. Damage on Trinidad was minor.

In Honduras, damage from Anna was moderate and limited to the Atlantic coast. In Plaplaya, the storm damaged 215 homes. In Trujillo, a number of buildings suffered damage. At Limón, nine houses were destroyed and eighteen more were left uninhabitable. Serious damage also occurred in Gracias a Dios Department, where hundreds of people were left homeless. On the Bay Islands, nine houses were demolished and thirteen suffered damage. High winds toppled about 5,000 coconut trees on Útila. Damage from Anna in Honduras amounted to $300,000. One person drowned and 12 other were injured, and victims required food and medical aid in Anna's wake. In Belize, Anna produced waves  and gusty winds. Though unspecific, there were reports of considerable damage in the country.

See also

1961 Atlantic hurricane season
Hurricane Abby (1960)
Hurricane Greta–Olivia
Hurricane Iris
Hurricane Felix

Notes

References

Anna
Anna (1961)
Anna (1961)
Hurricanes in Nicaragua
History of British Grenada